Ludwig Stark (19 June 1831 – 22 March 1884) was a German pianist, composer, teacher and musicologist.

Stark was born in Munich. He studied philosophy and music at the University of Munich and at the age of twenty-six co-founded the Conservatory of Stuttgart, where he also served as a teacher of harmony, singing and music history. In 1858 he published with Sigmund Lebert the Grosse theoretisch-praktische Klavierschule, a piano method which was translated into several languages and widely distributed in both Europe and America.

Stark died in Stuttgart, aged 52.

List of piano transcriptions

Bach's work

Prelude & Fugue in G minor, BWV 535
Toccata in D minor ("Dorian"), BWV 538
Toccata in F major, BWV 540

References

1831 births
1884 deaths
German pianists